The Old Timers' Cabin of Edmonton is a historic building in Edmonton, Alberta, Canada.

History 
The Old Timers' Cabin first opened in 1959. The structure is a natural log house with a stone chimney, a poplar floor, cedar shingles, and spruce window frames. 

The Old Timers' Cabin was built by a 76-year-old log specialist named Hobart Dowler for the Northern Alberta Pioneers and Descendants Association (NAPDA). The building was built from spruce logs that came from Dowler's Pigeon Lake property. The logs were measured, assembled and numbered at Pigeon Lake before being disassembled and remade on the building site in Edmonton. 

The Cabin is located in the North Saskatchewan river valley on Scona Hill, on a site which had been leveled to give fill to the Low Level Bridge. The style was intentionally picked for its status as a pioneer symbol, mirroring the Northern Alberta Pioneers and Descendants' association with the past. The association was founded in 1894 by a number of prominent Edmontonians such as for example, James Gibbons, Donald Ross Sr., John McDougall, and Harrison Young.

Events 
As of 2020, NAPDA continues to hold events and meetings at the Edmonton Old Timers Cabin.

References

External links 
 Official website

Buildings and structures completed in 1959
Log cabins in Canada
History of Alberta
Municipal Historic Resources of Edmonton